Anthony White may refer to:

Arts and entertainment
 Tony Atlas (born Anthony White in 1954), WWE personality and former professional wrestler
 Anthony White (artist) (born 1976), Australian artist
 J. White Did It (born Anthony Jermaine White in 1984), American record producer, songwriter, and DJ
 Anthony White, member of British jazz band Acoustic Alchemy

Other fields
 Anthony C. White, Bell electrical engineer who perfected the carbon microphone for telephone use
 Anthony Walton White (1750–1803), American cavalry officer in the Revolutionary War
 Tony White (cricketer) (Anthony Wilbur White, born 1938), former West Indian cricketer

See also
Anthony Whyte (writer), African-American novelist
Anthony Whyte (soccer), Canadian-born Guyanese soccer player
Tony White (disambiguation)